WYPY may refer to:

a former call sign for WTGE, an American radio station licensed to Baton Rouge, Louisiana, United States
a former call sign for WBRP, an American radio station licensed to Baker, Louisiana, United States